Maksim Igorevich Yeleyev (born 3 March 2001) is a Russian footballer who plays as a right-back or right midfielder for Metallurg Lipetsk.

Club career 
He first appeared on the bench for the senior squad of PFC CSKA Moscow on 15 September 2019 in a Russian Premier League game against FC Tambov. He was also included in CSKA's 2019–20 UEFA Europa League squad.

He made his debut for the main squad of PFC CSKA Moscow on 25 September 2019 in a Russian Cup game against FC Alania Vladikavkaz, he started the game and played the whole match.

On 31 July 2020, Yeleyev signed a new contract with CSKA Moscow, until the summer of 2024, and moved to Akron Tolyatti on a season-long loan deal. He made his Russian Football National League debut for Akron on 1 August 2020 in a game against FC Fakel Voronezh. He became a regular starter for Akron after that. On 20 February 2021, the loan was terminated early.

On 22 January 2021, Yeleyev joined Yenisey Krasnoyarsk on a 1.5-year loan until the end of the 2021–22 season. During the summer of 2021, Yeleyevs loan deal with Yenisey Krasnoyarsk was cut short, with the defender moving to Amkar Perm on a season-long loan deal on 19 July 2021. On 22 February 2022, Yeleyev moved on a new loan to Tekstilshchik Ivanovo. However, the loan to Tekstilshchik fell through and Yeleyev was registered as a CSKA player and appeared on the bench in some games late in the 2021–22 season.

On 30 August 2022, Yeleyev moved to Metallurg Lipetsk on a permanent basis.

Career statistics

References

External links 
 
 
 

2001 births
Living people
Russian footballers
Russia youth international footballers
PFC CSKA Moscow players
FC Yenisey Krasnoyarsk players
FC Akron Tolyatti players
FC Amkar Perm players
FC Metallurg Lipetsk players
Association football defenders
Russian First League players
Russian Second League players